Senator McKinney may refer to:

John P. McKinney (born 1964), Connecticut State Senate
Paul McKinney (politician) (1923–1995), Pennsylvania State Senate